Johann Heinrich Abicht (4 May 1762 – 28 April 1816) was a German philosopher.

Biography
His grandfather was teacher and organist in Wilmersdorf, Gehren, and his father was a teacher in Volkstedt. Johann Abicht himself finished the college in Rudolstadt and visited the University of Erlangen in 1781. In 1784 he became controller at the house of chief equerry von Schall in Öhringen. Abicht made his magister in 1786 and his doctor in philosophy in 1790. In the same year, he was appointed adjunct and then extraordinary professor in the philosophical faculty. He became regular professor in 1796. On 4 August 1804 he was appointed professor of logic and metaphysics at the newly reorganised university of Wilna. He died at Wilna, aged 53.

His philosophy is clearly influenced by Kant, later by Karl Leonhard Reinhold.

Publications
 De philosophiae Kantianae ad theologiam habitu, 1788
 Versuch einer Metaphysik des Vergnügens nach Kantischen Grundsätzen zur Grundlegung einer systematischen Thelematologie und Moral, 1789
 Philosophie der Erkenntnisse, 1791
 Hermias, oder Auflösung der die gültige Elementarphilosophie betreffenden Aenesidemischen Zweifel, 1794
 Philosophisches Journal, 4 volumes, 1794–1795, collaboration

Sources
 Allgemeine Deutsche Biographie - online version at Wikisource

18th-century German philosophers
Kantian philosophers
Academic staff of the University of Erlangen-Nuremberg
People from Rudolstadt
People from Schwarzburg-Rudolstadt
1762 births
1816 deaths
18th-century philosophers
19th-century German philosophers